Glenea flavicapilla is a species of beetle in the family Cerambycidae. It was described by Chevrolat in 1858. It is known from Gabon, the Ivory Coast, Cameroon, Ghana, and Kenya.

References

flavicapilla
Beetles described in 1858